Dóra Lucz (born 26 September 1994) is a retired Hungarian canoeist. She competed in the women's K-1 200 metres event at the 2020 Summer Olympics.

References

External links
 

1994 births
Living people
Hungarian female canoeists
Canoeists at the 2020 Summer Olympics
Olympic canoeists of Hungary